Fabio Fognini was the champion in 2014, when the event was last held, but chose to compete in Dubai instead.

Thiago Seyboth Wild won his first ATP Tour title, defeating Casper Ruud in the final, 7–5, 4–6, 6–3. Seyboth Wild also becomes the first player born in 2000 to win an ATP Tour title.

Seeds
The top four seeds received a bye into the second round.

Draw

Finals

Top half

Bottom half

Qualifying

Seeds

Qualifiers

Lucky loser

Qualifying draw

First qualifier

Second qualifier

Third qualifier

Fourth qualifier

References

External links
Main draw
Qualifying draw

2020 ATP Tour
2020 Singles